Kevin Collins is an American North American champion bridge player and an American Contract Bridge League (ACBL) Grand Life Master. He won the 2000 North American Pairs playing with Patty Tucker.

Bridge accomplishments

Wins
 North American Bridge Championships (1)
 North American Pairs (1) 2000

Runners-up
 North American Bridge Championships (1)
 Nail Life Master Open Pairs (1) 2021

Personal life
Kevin lives in Atlanta with his wife, Patty Tucker.

References

American contract bridge players
Living people
Year of birth missing (living people)